Secret (stylized as secret) is the fourth studio album by Japanese pop-R&B singer Kumi Koda, released in February 2005. It charted at #3 on Oricon in Japan, her highest charting album at the time, and stayed on the charts for fifty-six weeks.

This album also jump-started Kumi's ero-kawaii/sexy-cute image, with which she became synonymous. This style later spread throughout Japan's high school community upon her release of "Butterfly".

Information
Secret is the first predominantly-pop album by Kumi, with her first three albums, feel my mind, grow into one and affection, being R&B. Due to Kumi feeling most comfortable with the style she donned in "Crazy 4 U", she created the "sexy-cute" style (known as ero-kawaii) for her A-sides used in secret. This is the style that she became famous for and received both positive and negative attention. During her performance for "Cutie Honey" at Music Station, she donned the outfit she wore during the jazz parlor scenes in the music video. The outfit was heavily criticized, when revealing clothing was not worn by mainstream artists in Japan at the time.

On April 13, 2005, three special editions of the album were released, which contained the music video for "Hot Stuff", which featured the rapper  and, depending on which special edition was purchased, came with a T-shirt or a tank top.

The DVD contained the music videos originally released on her first DVD single, "girls ~Selfish~": "Selfish", "Shake It" and "24". The song "24", which was written and composed by the arranger Hitoshi Shimono, was the first song released by Kumi with an entire chorus in English. She worked with Hitoshi again for her 2006 song "Feel", which also contained a chorus completely in English.

Packaging
Secret was released in four editions: CD, CD+DVD and a special CD+DVD edition. While the standard editions of the CD and CD+DVD combinations contained the fifteen musical tracks, the special editions contained two bonus songs and a bonus music video. This edition also had achoice of either a tank top or a t-shirt.

The two bonus tracks contained on the special editions were "It's a Small World", which featured the female duo the Heartsdales, and a remix of "Hot Stuff", which featured the rappers KM-MARKIT and UZI. The bonus music video on the DVD of this version was the music video for the latter track.

Each edition contained different cover art.The CD only contained a blue heart, the CD+DVD contained a pink heart and the special edition contained a holographic heart.

Music videos

Two new music videos were released on the DVD: the album version of "hands", which was the first time a different version of a music video was released, and "Trust You". There was a different version of "Trust You" released on her "Hot Stuff" single, titled "Thanks to MAM & GRAMMA Version".

While there were only two new music videos, the music videos from "girls ~Selfish~" were also placed on the album, because of "girls ~Selfish~" being unsuccessful as a DVD single. These videos were "Selfish", "Shake It" and "24".

Trust You: set in the future where men use technology to set women to perform. The A.Is, Kumi along with two others, are able to become sentient and reclaim dominance. 
"Selfish": carries a story of female vampires luring men to their hideout so they are able to live off their life force.
"Shake It": carries a story of a man breaking into a tent, owned by Kumi. Kumi and her followers seduce him and convince him to leave. It is shown at the end he makes a phone call to an unknown source.
"24": a soft and sensual video, showing Kumi in her downtime as she fantasizes about a lover.

The music video to "Hot Stuff" was later placed on the DVD when the special edition was released two months later. The music video carried a dance battle theme, which had been inspired by the North American film You Got Served, which featured Omarion Grandberry and Marques Houston. Kumi later featured Omarion in 2012 "Slow" from her album Japonesque (2012).

Track listing

Special Edition Bonus Tracks

Charts 
Oricon Sales Chart (Japan)

Alternative versions
Let's Party
"Let's Party": Found on the album (2005)
"Let's Party [KOZM® Remix]": Found on Koda Kumi Driving Hit's 5 (2013)

Trust You
"Trust You": Found on the album (2005)
"Trust You [Dub's Trust me Remix]": Found on single "Hot Stuff feat. KM-MARKIT" (2005)

Selfish
"Selfish": Found on the album (2005)
"Selfish [D.I's C&B MIX]": Found on single "Hot Stuff feat. KM-MARKIT" (2005)
"Selfish [ALKA-LINE Remix]": Found on Koda Kumi Driving Hit's 8 (2018)

Promotional advertisements
"Selfish" was used as the theme to the 20th East Women's Ekiden

"Hearty..." was used as the promotional theme for the KOJIMA Ltd. product Fresh Gray 2005.

"Trust You" was used as MTV Japan's buzz ASIA theme for March 2005.

"24" was used as the theme song for SANCTUARY/Otona no Seiiki (サンクチュアリ/大人の聖域)

"Let's Party" was used for the television advertisement of Shueisha's MORE.

"It's a Small World feat. Heartsdales" was used as the theme song for Japan's release of the 2004 film 80 Days.

References

Koda Kumi albums
2005 albums
Avex Group albums